Basildon Meadows is a  biological Site of Special Scientific Interest on the southern outskirts of Basildon in Essex.

The site is composed of three unimproved meadows which have a wide variety of herbs. The principal grasses are creeping bent, rye-grass and crested dog's tail. Flowers include the green-winged orchid and yellow rattle, which are rare in Essex. There is also a small pond and scattered scrub.

The fields are private land with no public access.

References 

Sites of Special Scientific Interest in Essex
Meadows in Essex